The North Jersey Rail Commuter Association is a not for profit (501(c)(3)) railroad advocacy organization that was formed and incorporated in the United States in 1980.  During its history, the organization and its members have been involved in the successful advocacy of a number of projects involving NJ Transit Rail Operations.  NJRCA's headquarters are located in Knowlton Township, New Jersey.

Origins and mission 

NJRCA's mission is to advocate, in a non-partisan manner, rail projects that benefit New Jersey by educating public officials and the general public.  This advocacy includes the preservation of existing rail infrastructure wherever possible; and the initiation, reactivation or augmentation of rail service wherever practicable.

The first NJRCA president, Frederick H. Wertz, helped establish the organization in 1980, which was initially headquartered in Sparta, New Jersey.  Since that time, the organization has helped advocate a number of rail projects in New Jersey, particularly northern New Jersey.  Charles Walsh assumed the presidency of the organization in 1988, and has held that position since that time.  The organization's vice-president is Donald J. Barnickel, P.E., who also assumed the vice presidency in 1988.

Rail projects advocated 

Over time, NJRCA has advocated a number of projects involving NJ Transit Rail Operations (or other entities), including the restoration of rail service on the Lackawanna Cut-Off; the extension of service to Hackettstown, New Jersey; creation of Midtown Direct service (via the Kearny Connection) to New York City; creation of service via the Montclair Connection, the opening of NYS&W railroad service through Northern New Jersey; the building of a NJ Transit rail yard in Morrisville, PA; and the preservation of the Sussex Branch Trail.  The group was also successful in spearheading a 1989 state bond issue that set aside $25 million for the acquisition of railroad right-of-ways in the State of New Jersey.  Additionally, the group has advocated for the creation of a railroad and transportation museum in New Jersey and was successful in gaining support for designating the museum jointly in Netcong-Port Morris and Phillipsburg.

Lackawanna Cut-Off project 

Since its creation in 1980, NJRCA has spearheaded the effort to preserve and reactivate the Lackawanna Cut-Off.  In 1979, as a result of a consolidation of Conrail's east-west rail routes, freight service was discontinued on the Cut-Off.  This occurred in the aftermath of Conrail's taking over the operation of the line from the Erie Lackawanna Railroad in 1976.  Passenger service on the line ceased on January 6, 1970. The discontinuation of freight service on the Cut-Off opened the door for possible abandonment of the route and removal of the tracks on the line.  

NJRCA participated in meetings that were held between 1980 and 1984 in an effort to obtain funding to purchase the 88-mile (142 km) rail corridor between Port Morris Jct (NJ) and Scranton, Pennsylvania, which included the 28.6-mile (45 km)-long Cut-Off between Port Morris Junction and Slateford Junction (PA).  Funding was sought in New Jersey via the Sussex County Board of Chosen Freeholders, the Morris County Board of Transportation, and the Morris County, NJ Board of Chosen Freeholders; and in Pennsylvania via the Monroe County Railroad Authority (the predecessor of the Pennsylvania Northeast Regional Railroad Authority).  In the end, sufficient funding could not be obtained, and the tracks on the Cut-Off were removed during the summer and fall of 1984. Conrail also indicated that it intended to remove the 60-mile (97 km) stretch of double track between Slateford, Pennsylvania, and Scranton, Pennsylvania; however, Conrail was persuaded to remove only one of the tracks, leaving an intact single-track railroad in Pennsylvania.

In 1985, Conrail announced that it had sold the right-of-way of the Cut-Off to two developers, Jerry Turco and Burton Goldmeier.  Goldmeier had acquired the easternmost mile (1.6 km) of the Cut-Off, while Turco had acquired the remaining 26-mile (44 km) section of the line in New Jersey and approximately one-mile (1.6 km) section in Pennsylvania.  By 1986, Turco had announced a proposal to use the Cut-Off as a source for fill material and to use the "cuts" on the Cut-Off as construction landfills.  This triggered a negative public reaction, and a push to have the State of New Jersey acquire the Cut-Off through eminent domain.

From 1987 to 1989, representatives from NJRCA met with public officials in both New Jersey and Pennsylvania in an effort to solidify support for preserving the line and, in New Jersey, to support the creation of a state bond issue to fund the state's acquisition of the Cut-Off.  An agreement was struck with then-New Jersey Assemblyman Chuck Haytaian to support the extension of NJ Transit rail service to Hackettstown, New Jersey, in turn for his support of the Lackawanna Cut-Off project and the bond issue.  During the same timeframe, NJRCA also met several times with Turco in an effort to dissuade him from pursuing the destruction of the Cut-Off.  As such, a state bond issue was successfully approved by the voters in New Jersey in November, 1989, which set aside $25 million for the purchase of rail rights-of-way in New Jersey.

Starting in 1990, the New Jersey Department of Transportation initiated the use of eminent domain against Turco and Goldmeier, resulting in the State of New Jersey acquiring the right-of-way for a total of $21 million in 2001.

At present, NJRCA continues to work with public officials in advocacy for the reactivation of the Lackawanna Cut-Off, specifically, at this point, the extension of rail service to Andover, New Jersey.  However, the group will continue to be involved in the advocacy for the extension of service along the entire length of the Cut-Off in New Jersey for the foreseeable future.

Railroad museum activities 

With its rich transportation history, and the lack of a unifying entity to preserve it, rail and transportation advocates in New Jersey began seeking support for the creation of a state museum during the 1980s.  An independent state commission was created by an act of the New Jersey State Legislature in 1986.  The 16-member body was charged with identifying a site as well as funding for the museum.  In 1989, the commission recommended that an unspecified site in Flemington, New Jersey, be designated as the museum's home.  With no funding available, however, the idea of creating such a museum was temporarily set aside.  In 1996, NJRCA President Charles Walsh was nominated to serve on a newly constituted state commission that would revisit the creation of a state railroad and transportation museum in New Jersey.

Shortly thereafter, NJRCA helped establish the Netcong-Port Morris (N-PM) Site Committee.  The N-PM Site Committee's main responsibility was to act as a liaison between the museum commission and the towns—Netcong, NJ and Roxbury Township, New Jersey—that would be home to the museum.  In addition to representatives from NJRCA, the committee had representatives from Netcong Boro and Roxbury Township, members of the railfan community, canal enthusiasts, Amtrak, preservationists, and other ad hoc members from the region.

In October, 1998, the commission's chairman, Assemblyman Alex DeCroce, announced that the choice had been narrowed down to three sites in New Jersey: Phillipsburg, Plainfield and Netcong-Port Morris.  By the time this announcement was made, it had become clear that the majority of members on the NJ State Railroad & Transportation Museum Commission were in favor of placing the museum in Phillipsburg.  Subsequently, in early 1999, DeCroce permitted a vote to take place that designated Phillipsburg as the museum site.  Walsh, however, continued to openly support the Netcong-Port Morris site, leading to his not being reappointed to the commission when his term expired later that year.  Walsh's seat on the commission was filled by transportation magnate Anthony Imperatore.

As such, Walsh, in conjunction with NJRCA and the N-PM Site Committee continued to advocate for the Netcong-Port Morris site and in the process gained the support of New Jersey State Senate leader Robert Littell, who at that time was the chairman of the New Jersey Senate Budget and Appropriations Committee, and who struck an agreement with DeCroce to amend proposed legislation from the New Jersey General Assembly to designate both Phillipsburg and Netcong-Port Morris as joint sites for the museum.  The legislation was subsequently signed into law in 2001.

Since that time, there has been activity within Phillipsburg to attempt to build the museum there, although the originally envisioned site, which is privately owned, was never acquired by the state of New Jersey and has since been designated for other purposes.  In Netcong, there has been little activity thus far, although with the reactivation of the Lackawanna Cut-Off it is envisioned that the train station in Netcong could act as the eastern terminus for Steamtown train excursions from Scranton, Pennsylvania.

Proposals for current and future projects 

In addition to the Lackawanna Cut-Off project, NJRCA has advocated the Gateway Tunnel (formerly known as the ARC Tunnel), including the proposal for run-through tracks at Penn Station, New York, with a connection to Grand Central Station.  NJRCA has also proposed weekend rail service be instituted along the entire length of NJ Transit's Montclair-Boonton Line; that the Montclair-Boonton Line between Great Notch, NJ and Denville, New Jersey be electrified; and that all or part of NJ Transit's Gladstone Branch be double-tracked.

References

Rail advocacy organizations in the United States
Passenger rail transportation in the United States
Non-profit organizations based in New Jersey
Nonpartisan organizations in the United States
Organizations established in 1980
Lackawanna Cut-Off